Francisco de Paula Suárez Peredo y Bezares (born 1823 in Puebla, Puebla) was a Mexican clergyman and bishop for the Roman Catholic Archdiocese of Xalapa. He was ordained in 1848. He was appointed bishop in 1863. He died in 1870.

References 

1823 births
1870 deaths
Mexican Roman Catholic bishops
People from Puebla (city)